Aligol (also Romanized as ‘Alīgol, ‘Alīkal, and ‘Alīkol; also known as Qal‘eh-ye ‘Alī Kal and Qal‘eh-ye Alīgol) is a village in Aladagh Rural District, in the Central District of Bojnord County, North Khorasan Province, Iran. At the 2006 census, its population was 822, in 209 families.

References 

Populated places in Bojnord County